The 1968 All-Big Eight Conference football team consists of American football players chosen by various organizations for All-Big Eight Conference teams for the 1968 NCAA University Division football season.  The selectors for the 1968 season included the Associated Press (AP).

Offensive selections

Ends
 Steve Zabel, Oklahoma (AP)
 Dave Jones, Kansas State (AP)

Tackles
 Mike Montler, Colorado (AP)
 Keith Christensen, Kansas (AP)

Guards
 Joe Armstrong, Nebraska (AP)
 Jim Anderson, Missouri (AP)

Centers
 Jon Kolb, Oklahoma State (AP)

Backs
 Bobby Douglass, Kansas (AP)
 Steve Owens, Oklahoma (AP)
 Eddie Hinton, Oklahoma (AP)
 John Riggins, Kansas (AP)
 Bob Anderson, Colorado (AP)

Defensive selections

Defensive ends
 John Zook, Kansas (AP)
 Bill Schmitt, Missouri (AP)

Defensive tackles
 Jay "Rocky" Wallace, Missouri (AP)
 George Dimitri, Iowa State (AP)

Middle guards
 John Little, Oklahoma State (AP)

Linebackers
 Emery Hicks, Kansas (AP)
 Ken Geddes, Nebraska (AP)
 Rocky Martin, Colorado (AP)

Defensive backs
 Roger Wehrli, Missouri (AP)
 Steve Barrett, Oklahoma (AP)
 Dana Stephenson, Nebraska (AP)

Key
AP = Associated Press

See also
 1968 College Football All-America Team

References

All-Big Seven Conference football team
All-Big Eight Conference football teams